The Ibn Danan Synagogue is a synagogue in Fes, Morocco, dating from the 17th century. It was built by Mimoun Ben Sidan, a wealthy merchant from the town of Ait Ishaq. The synagogue is located in the Mellah district within Fes el-Jdid, one of the components of the historic medina of Fes.

Architecture

The synagogue was once only one of several inside the walls of Fes, and not the most elaborate. It is entered through a simple doorway indistinguishable from the doors of nearby houses. The door leads immediately to a short flight of stairs that lead into the high, rectangular space of the synagogue. The construction is masonry coated with plaster. The wooden ceiling is beamed and painted. The room is lit by small windows high in the walls. Photos taken in 1954 show a ceiling hung with numerous memorial lamps, now vanished. The walls are wainscotted with blue figured Moroccan tiles. The large Torah Ark, a cupboard filling the width of an entire wall, is made of carved wood. The wall above is decorated with intricately carved plaster work. Opposite the Torah Ark is a raised alcove, separated from the main prayer space by a wooden screen elaborately carved with a series of arches. It was intended as a seating area for the congregations more distinguished members. The bimah is accessed from this space, constructed as a small platform cantilevered out form the raised area. The wooden bimah is topped by a wrought iron canopy of Islamic-style arches and floral forms, culminating in a crown.

A very early restoration is known to have taken place in the 1870s. More recently, the Jewish community of Fez has also struggled for its preservation, and successfully nominated the building to the 1996 World Monuments Watch of the World Monuments Fund. According to the Fund, the plaster was peeling, the roofs were collapsing, the waterlogged beams were rotting, and windows were broken and missing. The organization helped restore the synagogue with funding from American Express and in collaboration with Morocco's Ministry of Culture and the Judeo-Moroccan Cultural Heritage Foundation (Fondation du Patrimoine Culturel Judeo-Marocain). Following the restoration, the synagogue reopened in 1999.

References

External links 
 "The Ibn Danan Synagogue, Fez, Morocco", The Museum of the Jewish People at Beit Hatfutsot

Orthodox Judaism in North Africa
Orthodox synagogues
Synagogues in Morocco
17th-century synagogues
Buildings and structures in Fez, Morocco
Tourist attractions in Fez, Morocco
Judaism in Fez